Boyce v R is a 2004 Judicial Committee of the Privy Council (JCPC) case which upheld the law that sets out a mandatory sentence of death for murder in Barbados.

The JCPC held in some cases, the law that makes capital punishment mandatory for murder will violate the prohibition on "inhuman or degrading punishment" in the Constitution of Barbados. (This principle is consistent with the 2002 JCPC cases of Hughes, Fox, and Reyes.) However, because (1) the Constitution of Barbados disallows itself to act to invalidate laws that existed prior to the enactment of the constitution, and (2) the law in question pre-dated the constitution, the mandatory death provisions of the law could not be invalidated and must be upheld.

In Matthew v S, which was released on the same day, the JCPC applied the same principles to a similar law in Trinidad and Tobago.

See also 
 Judiciary of Barbados
 Attorney General of Barbados
 Supreme Court of Judicature (Barbados)

Notes

External links 
Boyce v R, bailii.org
Boyce et al. v. Barbados - Inter-American Court of Human Rights Project, Loyola Law School (Los Angeles) International and Comparative Law Review’s Inter-American Court of Human Rights Project database and journal.

2004 in case law
2004 in Barbados
Death penalty case law
Judicial Committee of the Privy Council cases on appeal from Barbados
Prisoners sentenced to death by Barbados
Murder in Barbados
Human rights in Barbados